The 2019–20 season sees Olimpia Milano competing in both EuroLeague and Lega Basket Serie A. The first is the highest level of European basketball competitions, for which Milano has a license. While in the Italian Serie A, Milano needs a confirmation after having lost the previous year championship in the semifinal against Dinamo Sassari, despite being the favourite team.

For the second year in a row, Olimpia Milano is sponsored by Armani Exchange.

Overview
The 2019/2020 is a season of big changes and unfortunate epilogue due to the COVID-19 pandemic.

After having lost in any competitions of the disappointing 2018-19 season, the team first replaces the president Livio Proli with Pantaleo Dell'Orco and then the head Coach Simone Pianigiani. Ettore Messina is called to manage the team for the 2019/2020 season

Messina stated during the press conference of his presentation that the season objectives are to win the Italian Serie A and to reach the EuroLeague playoffs.

The season had a great start in Euroleague with seven wins and only two losses, while in the Italian league Milano struggles to find continuity. Soon the team starts vacillating also in Euroleague where, after the successful run, they manage to lose nine games out of twelve.

Milano ends the first half of the season with a disappointing loss in the derby against Cantù, when Messina expressed his concern about the ongoing season. The management was compelled to some corrective actions by releasing Aaron White and Shelvin Mack, after their unsatisfying performances, and hire Keifer Sykes (who joined the team already in December) and Drew Crawford, the latter only for the Euroleague.

The 2020 was the year of the coronavirus pandemic outbreak that interested first Italy and then spread out all over Europe. The Lega Basket was the first organization that decided to suspend the competition to both comply to the government directives and avoid spreading the virus amongst the players. Meanwhile Real Madrid announced on 12 March that one player was positive to the virus, only six days after the match against Milan. Euroleague followed with the decision of interrupting the competition while Milan decided to voluntarily enter in quarantine.

During the pandemic period, Lombardy was the region in Italy which suffered the most from the coronavirus. The team and the players decided to devolve part of their salary to the region's health care.

On 7 April the FIP, Italian Basketball Federation, declares the end of the season without winners.

The same choice followed for the Euroleague season on 25 May and that concludes Milano's 2019-20 season.

Timeline 
 2 June 2019: President Livio Proli and Milano part ways.
 11 June 2019: Simone Pianigiani and Milano part ways.
 11 June 2019: Ettore Messina is appointed for the role of both president and head coach.
 19 August 2019: Milano starts the summer preparation.
 31 August 2019: Milano starts the preseason with the match against Junior Casale.
 22 September 2019: last match of the preseason against Maccabi Tel Aviv. Milano ends the preseason without any loss.
 26 September 2019: the 2019-20 Lega Basket Serie A season starts and Milano debuts with a win against Universo Treviso Basket.
 29 September 2019: Milano signs Argentinian international Luis Scola.
 3 October 2019: the 2019-20 EuroLeague season starts and Milano debuts with a loss against Bayern Munich.
 4 November 2019: Sergio Rodríguez is nominated EuroLeague MVP for the month of October.
 27 December 2019: Milano hires playmaker Keifer Sykes from the Chinese Guangzhou Loong Lions team.
 5 January 2020: Milano ends the first half of the season with the loss against Cantù, in fourth position, with 10 wins and 6 losses in the Serie A and in 7th position, with 9 wins and 8 losses in the EuroLeague. Coach Ettore Messina expresses his disappointment in the after match interview.
 16 January: Shelvin Mack and Aaron White leave the team; they will play respectively in Iberostar Tenerife and Hapoel Jerusalem.
 27 January: forward Drew Crawford joins the team until the end of the season. The 2018–19 LBA season MVP started the 2019-2020 season in Turkey with Gaziantep Basketbol.
 13 February 2020: Starts the 2020 edition of the Italian Basketball Cup. Milano was eliminated in the semifinal by Reyer Venezia.
 9 March 2020: the Serie A is suspended due to the coronavirus.
 12 March 2020: the EuroLeague is suspended due to the coronavirus. The team enters in voluntary quarantine.
 7 April 2020: the Serie A is cancelled.
 8 May 2020: the trainings are gradually resumed.
 25 May 2020: The Euroleague season is cancelled.

Kit 
Supplier: Armani / Sponsor: Armani Exchange

Lega Basket Serie A

EuroLeague

Italian Cup 
Due to the dramatic events connected to Kobe Bryant, Milano decided to honour him by using in the opening game of the Italian Cup a purple and yellow jersey. The second jersey with a predominant yellow colour and purple sides, was never used.

Team

Players

Depth chart

Squad changes

In 
Drew Crawford was hired in January, after the injuries in the small forward role of Moraschini and Brooks. His Euroleague escape was used for the transfer. Crawford could be used, though, only in the Euroleague because there was no room left for more foreign players in the roster for the Italian championship, the last spot was taken by Keifer Sykes.

|}

Out 

|}

Confirmed 

|}

Coach

Youth team 
The following players have been called from the youth team and have made their appearance in the championship.

|}

Preseason players 
The following players have joined the team for the preseason matches. Biligha, Brooks and Della Valle where playing in the Italian national team for the World Cup. In the same competition Roll was playing for the Tunisian team. Gudaitis and Nedović were out because of physical condition.

Aleksandr Šaškov is under contract with Milano and last year played on loan for V.L. Pesaro.

Staff and management 
In the current season the team organization introduces a new element in the Italian Basketball where the head coach covers both the role of coach and president.

Pre-season and friendlies
Friendly training

Memorial Luciano Giani

Trofeo Carlo Lovari

Friendly match

City of Cagliari international basketball tournament

Derby of Milan

Pavlos Giannakopoulos tournament

Competitions

Overview

Serie A 

The 2019–20 LBA season is made of 17 teams, which means that a team will skip two rounds during the season. Milano will not play in round 15 and round 32.

League table

Results summary

Results by round

Matches

Due to the COVID-19 pandemic in Italy the Serie A games could not be scheduled regularly. An emergency government decree was issued in the night of 7 March, which put at risk the regular prosecution of the competition A following decree established that all the competitions and players gathering had to be suspended until 3 April.

After the Italian Basketball Federation (FIP) meeting, the season came to an early end without winners, the following matches were cancelled.

EuroLeague

League table

Results summary

Results by round

Matches

On 12 March Euroleague decided to suspend the championship after the COVID-19 pandemic all over Europe and some European teams were as well affected. Despite the various attempts to restore the season  the executive board decided to definitely cancel the season and the following games were never played.

Zurich Connect Final Eight 

Milano qualified to the 2020 Italian Basketball Cup having ended the first half of the season in 2nd place. They lost the semifinal against Reyer Venezia.

Matches

Statistics

Individual statistics Serie A 

 Y– Players that come from the youth team
 L– Players who left the team before the end of the season

Individual statistics Euroleague 

 Y– Players that come from the youth team
 L– Players who left the team before the end of the season

Individual statistics Italian Cup 

 Y– Players that come from the youth team
 L– Players who left the team before the end of the season

Season individual statistics 

 Y– Players that come from the youth team
 L– Players who left the team before the end of the season

Individual game highs 

 1– at least 5 attempts
 OT– match ended in overtime

Team game highs 

 OT– match ended in overtime

References

External links
 

2019–20 EuroLeague by club
2019–20 in European basketball by club
2019–20 in Italian basketball
Olimpia Milano seasons
Season